

Legislative assemblies  
Parliament of Sweden or Riksdagen
Parliament of Finland, officially called Riksdagen in Swedish
Riksdag of the Estates, the feudal legislature in Sweden from 1486 to 1866 and in Finland until 1809

Buildings
Riksdagshuset, the specific Swedish word for the Parliamentary buildings, often simply shortened to Riksdagen. In this context it may refer to:
 Parliament House, Stockholm
 Parliament House, Helsinki

See also 
 Reichstag (disambiguation), the German term for parliament, translated to Riksdag in Swedish
 Riigikogu, the national legislature of Estonia
 Rigsdagen, the legislature of Denmark from 1849 to 1953
 Riksråd, generic term for various Royal Councils in Scandinavian countries
 Reichsrat (disambiguation), German cognate of Riksråd